Club Fernando de la Mora is an association football club from the city of Asunción, Paraguay. The team got promoted to the first division of the Liga Paraguaya in 2005 by being the runner-up of the second division league (Intermedia) but got immediately relegated back to the second division by finishing last in the point average in the 2006 season.

Honours
Second Division: 1
1930

Third Division: 4
1949, 1950, 1958, 2003

2015 squad
As of January 18, 2015

Notable players
To appear in this section a player must have either:
 Played at least 125 games for the club.
 Set a club record or won an individual award while at the club.
 Been part of a national team at any time.
 Played in the first division of any other football association (outside of Paraguay).
 Played in a continental and/or intercontinental competition.

Non-CONMEBOL players

 Bryan Lopez (2010)

References

External links
Official site
Info in Albigol

Fernando de la Mora
Association football clubs established in 1925
Football clubs in Asunción
1925 establishments in Paraguay